John Anthony Korfas (born August 21, 1962) is a Greek-American professional basketball coach and former player. A EuroLeague All-Final Four Team member in 1993 (PAOK), he won all three FIBA Europe continental trophies at the club level: the EuroLeague in 1996 (Panathinaikos), the Saporta Cup in 1991 (PAOK), as well as the Korać Cup in 1994 (PAOK). As a player, his nickname was Tintin. He became well known in Europe, due to his very unusual one-handed jump shot.

High school
Korfas began his basketball career as a key member of the Santa Barbara, California, San Marcos High School basketball team, which had a perfect 26–0 season, when they were known as the Runnin' Royals. They advanced to the CIF finals, and were defeated by Long Beach Poly, by a score of 65–63.

College career
Korfas played college basketball at Pepperdine University, with the Pepperdine Waves, from 1982 to 1986.

Professional career
Korfas played for the Greek League club PAOK, with whom he won the Cup Winners' Cup in 1991, the Greek League championship in 1992, Korać Cup in 1994, and the Greek Cup in 1995. With PAOK, Korfas was also a Cup Winners' Cup finalist in 1992, and a Greek Cup finalist in 1989, 1990, and 1991. He also took the third place with PAOK at the 1993 EuroLeague Final Four in Athens, being selected to the EuroLeague All-Final Four Team in the process.

After leaving PAOK in 1995, Korfas played for PAO, winning the EuroLeague championship and Greek Cup with the team in 1996, in addition to the FIBA Club World Cup the same year. In 1998, he moved to Maroussi, and took third place with the club at the Greek Cup final four of 2000.

National team career
Korfas was part of the senior men's Greek national basketball team during the EuroBasket 1989. He did not however take part in any of the tournament games.

Coaching career
After he retired from playing pro basketball, Korfas worked as a basketball coach. He was the head coach of the Greek clubs Papagou, PAOK, Apollon Kalamarias, and HAN Thessaloniki.

Personal life
Korfas was born in Akron, Ohio, to a Greek father from Zakynthos and an American mother. He has two children, Stefan and Patricia. Stefan is also a professional basketball player.

External links 
FIBA EuroLeague Profile
Hellenic Basketball Federation Profile 

1962 births
Living people
American men's basketball players
American people of Greek descent
Basketball players from Akron, Ohio
Greek basketball coaches
Greek men's basketball players
Greek Basket League players
Irakleio B.C. players
Maroussi B.C. players
Panathinaikos B.C. players
P.A.O.K. BC players
Papagou B.C. players
Papagou B.C. coaches
P.A.O.K. BC coaches
Pepperdine Waves men's basketball players
Point guards